Maddalena Campiglia (April 13, 1553 - January 28, 1595) was an Italian poet. She is remembered for being praised by Torquato Tasso for the composition of the pastoral fable Flori, inspired by Aminta.

Biography
Maddalena Campiglia was born in Vicenza on April 13, 1553, an illegitimate child of Polissena Verlato and Carlo Campiglia. Both nobles and widowers, parents of two sons older than Maddalena, the two regularized their union only in 1565.
 
During her studies, the young Campiglia showed particular interest in literature, philosophy and music. Also important for her intellectual development was the attendance of the cultural society of the 16th century that met in the province of Vicenza at the villa owned by her cousin Elena, married to the Marquis Guido Sforza Gonzaga. Here she met: Curzio Gonzaga, Marquis of Palazzolo, poet and diplomat, a friend of writers and artists, who gained Campiglia's trust to the point of being designated by her in the will as curator of her writings; Bernardino Baldi and Torquato Tasso.
 
Presumably at the villa Gonzaga she met Dionisio da Colzè (or Calzé) whom she married in 1576; the marriage lasted till 1580, the year in which she separated and began to live alone. There was, by imposition of Campiglia, a white marriage, as can be deduced from the acts of separation from which it can also be understood her lack of predisposition towards motherhood.
 
In 1580 it also began her literary production, with writings of a religious nature in which, however, the nonconformist spirit was already visible. According to Campiglia, virginity had to be lived not as a constraint but as an effective means of achieving female independence from the male gender. As incarnation par excellence of this principle, she indicated the Virgin Mary who, according to her, had spontaneously voted for chastity and because of the greatness of this choice she had been chosen by God. She expressed this concept in "Discorso intorno all'Annunciazione della Vergine", printed in Vicenza in 1585.
 
The most recognized work of Campiglia was Flori, a "boscareccia" fable inspired by the Aminta of Torquato Tasso that earned her the compliments of the poet himself. It was printed in Vicenza in 1588 and it was dedicated to Curzio Gonzaga. Flori is a virgin nymph devoted to the cult of Diana, who, struck by the death of her beloved friend Amaranta, despite the love of her girlfriend Licori, is destined to fall in love with the first man she meets. Although in love with the shepherd who meets the nymph, she accepts only a chaste marriage.

In addition to the theme of virginity, in this work is introduced another delicate theme, the love between women. This topic finds its maximum expression in the meaning of the phrase "Donna amando pur Donna essendo" (Loving a woman despite being a woman).
 
In 1589 she published Calisa. Two shepherds, Edreo and Clori, celebrated the marriage of Lico, son of Calisa, with Bice. In real life Calisa is Isabella Pallavicini Lupi, marquise of Soragna, protector of Campiglia, to whom Calisa and numerous other sonnets are dedicated.

After 1589, Campiglia, already affected by the illness that would kill her, did not publish independent works. Some of her sonnets appeared in other collections (Rime by A. Grillo (1589) and Rime by O. Zambrini (1594)).
 
Maddalena Campiglia died in Vicenza on January 28, 1595, following a long illness that deprived her of sight. In her last years, Campiglia approached the monastic environments and became a terziaria of San Domenico and in her will she requested to be buried in the same sepulcher of the Abbesses Giulia Cisotta, near the church of Santa Maria d'Araceli in Vicenza.

References

1553 births
1595 deaths
Italian women poets
16th-century Italian poets
16th-century Italian women writers
People from Vicenza